Società Sportiva Dilettantistica Sanremese Calcio, commonly referred to as Sanremese and officially as S.S.D. Unione Sanremo S.r.l., is an Italian association football club, based in Sanremo, Liguria.

The historical U.S. Sanremese Calcio 1904 was liquidated in 2011. The present-day club was established in 2015.

Currently it plays in Serie D.

History

From 1904 to 1987
The club was founded in 1904 as U.S. Sanremese 1904, but the football team was founded only in 1911. The US Sanremese Calcio 1904 was born by the merger of the first two local teams: the Ausonia and the Speranza.

The team played three seasons in Serie B from 1937–38 to 1939–40 when they were relegated in Serie C.
In the 1937–38 season gets the 9th place in Serie B that is the best result ever in club history.

It's the only Italian team to have played in every championship of Serie C in a sole national division from 1952–53 to 1957–58.

The team from 1977–78 to 1978–79 came from Serie D to Serie C1.
The club played seven consecutive seasons in Serie C1 from 1979 to 1980, when it achieved an historic 4th place, to 1985–86 when they retreated in Serie C2 and the next year in Serie D.

Anglo-Italian Cup
In the season 1980–81 it played the Anglo-Italian Cup, called in this year Talbot Challenge Cup. The team won 3–1 with Hungerford Town and 2–1 with Bridgend Town, draw 2–2 with Oxford City and lost 1–0 with Poole Town. It ranked third in the group with 7 points, dominated by Modena then won the competition.

The bankruptcy
In the summer of 1987 the company fell after 83 years of existence because of the large debts.

From 1987 to 2008

The rebirth
The club was refounded in 1987 allocating by the Terza Categoria as Sanremese Football Club 1904

On 1992 with the merger with Sanremo 80, it filming the historic name of U.S. Sanremese Calcio 1904.

Eccellenza
In the league 1991–92 and 1995–96 the club won the regional Eccellenza Liguria gaining promotion to Serie D and the 1995–96 Regional Coppa Italia Liguria:.

Between Serie C2 and Serie D
In the season 1997–98 won the Serie D and lost in the final scudetto with the Giugliano.
The team played two seasons in Serie C2 from 1998–99 to 1999–2000 when it retreated to Serie D.

The club played four seasons in Serie D from 2000–01 to 2001–04 when was admitted to Serie C2.

The team played three seasons in Serie C2 from 2004–05 to 2006–07 when it retreated to Serie D.

On the season 2005–06 lost the final Coppa Italia Serie C with the Gallipoli lose away 1–0 and at home wins 2–1.

From November 2007, most of the players leave the team, become in the meantime USD Sanremese 1904, which was in strong crisis of liquidity, for non-payment of wages, thus leading to relegation from the Serie D.

The radiation
On 10 July 2008 the club was declared inactive to the FIGC after being refused entry to the League of Eccellenza, because of the large debts.

In summer 2008, the last president Carlo Barillà refounded the team with the same name of U.S.D. Sanremese 1904, that played in the season 2008–09 in Seconda Categoria.

From 2009 to 2011

The second refoundation
On 4 August 2009 the Ospedaletti-Sanremo, just promoted from the Promozione Ligure girone A, after the agreement with Carlo Barillà for the cessation of the homonymous team that he was founded, changes name in U.S.D. Sanremese Calcio 1904: so the company's family Del Gratta has been the only legitimate heir of the old society.

2009–10 Eccellenza
In the league 2009–10, coached by Giancarlo "Carlo" Calabria Sanremese wins the regional Eccellenza Liguria gaining promotion in Serie D. and the Regional Coppa Italia Liguria:. It eliminated in the Coppa Italia Dilettanti 2009-2010 from Bolzano, in the quarter-finals losing for 1–2 at home and equalizing 0–0 away.

2010–11 Lega Pro Seconda Divisione

On 4 August 2010 became U.S. Sanremese Calcio 1904 the team obtained the admission into Lega Pro Seconda Divisione group A for the 2010–11 season. The club initially survived relegation on the pitch after a 3-2 aggregate win over Sacilese Calcio in the playoff round.

The owners Del Gratta arrested resign
After the arrest, of 15 March 2011, of Marco and his father Riccardo Del Gratta, respectively President and Director General, the company was temporarily administered by Giancarlo Lupi, a brother-in-law of the President Marco Del Gratta.

They are accused of being the beneficiaries of the alleged threats and extortions to players of Sanremese, so that the latter rescind the onerous contracts signed in the summer.

Since 16 March 2011, after the resignations of the owners Marco and Riccardo Del Gratta, the new CEO was Giuseppe Fava, who was previously responsible for the youth sector.

Liquidation
On 30 June 2011, the club wasn't able to enter 2011–12 Lega Pro Seconda Divisione for failure to submit the required surety agreement and was so subsequently liquidated.

The new Sanremese

After a year of inactivity, in the summer 2012 the club was refounded as  A.S.D. Sanremese by the entrepreneur Luca Colangelo and currently president, restarting from Terza Categoria Savona/Imperia. In the summer 2013 the club placed 2nd was promoted to repechage in Seconda Categoria.

Its home stadium has been the Campo Sportivo Pian di Poma in Sanremo.

The club on 6 October 2013, after a disastrous start on the group AB of Seconda Categoria Liguria sacked Mattia Moraglia, the coach of last season, replaced until the resignations of 21 October by Marco Pinto and after by Fabrizio Gatti. The club was promoted to Prima Categoria after the play off round.

In 2015, the club gave up its membership to allow another local club, ASD Carlin's Boys, to change its name to Unione Sanremo and restart from Eccellenza. The club won the Coppa Italia Dilettanti in 2016, thus ensuring automatic promotion to Serie D on their first year. The club was renamed Sanremese Calcio in 2019.

Its home stadium is the Stadio Comunale in Sanremo.

Chronology

Italian Football Championship
The U.S. Sanremese Calcio 1904 has played 60 national leagues:
 3 times in Serie B: the first on 1937–38, the last on 1939–40
 38 times in Lega Pro: the first on 1934–35, the last on 2010–11
 19 times in Serie D: the first on 1963–64, the last on 2007–08.

Colors and badge
The team's colors are light blue and white, the second shirt is red.

Stadio Comunale
The A.S.D. Sanremese such as the historic U.S. Sanremese Calcio 1904 played at the Stadio Comunale of Sanremo, site in Corso Mazzini 15.

In the 2012–13 season had played here in Promozione Liguria girone A the A.S.D. Carlin's Boys, team founded in 1947 by the co-founder Carlo Carcano and currently main team of the city.

The stadium has the grass field and a capacity of around 4,000 seats:
 850 in covered tribune
 2250 in hailstorm: 1050 in the upper ring, 1200 in than lower
 850 in the area for the guests
 8 in the balcony floor for the reporters and three locations for the cameras.

Honours
 Serie C:
 Winners: Serie C 1936-37, Serie C 1946-47 group A
 Serie C2:
 Winner: Serie C2 1978–79
 Serie D:
 Promoted: 1997–98
 National Runners-up: 1997–98
 Eccellenza Liguria:
 Winners: 1991–92, 1995–96, 2009–10
 Coppa Italia Serie C:
 Runners-up: 2005–06
 Coppa Italia Dilettanti:
Winners: 2015–16
Regional Coppa Italia Liguria:
 Winners: 1995–96, 2009–10

Notes

References

External links
 Official fans site 
 Official encyclopedia site 

 
Sanremo
Football clubs in Liguria
Association football clubs established in 1904
Serie B clubs
Serie C clubs
1904 establishments in Italy